Nesticus barri is a species of true spider in the family Nesticidae. It is found in the United States.

References

Nesticidae
Articles created by Qbugbot
Spiders described in 1984